Beit Mellat   is a  town in Akkar Governorate, Lebanon, close to the border with Syria.

The population in Beit Mellat are mostly Maronite.

History
In 1838, Eli Smith noted  the village as Beit Melat,  whose inhabitants were Maronite, located south of esh-Sheikh Mohammed.

References

Bibliography

External links
Beit Mellat, Localiban 

Populated places in Akkar District
Maronite Christian communities in Lebanon